Events from the year 2009 in Romania.

Incumbents

President: Traian Băsescu
Prime Minister: Emil Boc

Events 
 June 7 - 2009 European Parliament election in Romania
 July 16 - Stadium Cluj Arena construction begins on the site of demolished Ion Moina Stadium.
 November 24 - The Avdhela Project, an Aromanian digital library and cultural initiative, is launched in the Romanian Peasant Museum in Bucharest.
 December 6 - 2009 Romanian presidential election
 2009 - Badly affected by the Late-2000s recession, the International Monetary Fund and other lenders agree to provide Romania a rescue package worth 20bn Euros.

Deaths

January 

 January 5 - Mircea Stănescu, 39, Romanian politician, MP (2004–2008), apparent suicide by gunshot.
 January 9 - István Antal, 50, Romanian Olympic ice hockey player, cardiac arrest.

February 

 February 8 – Marian Cozma, 26, Romanian handball player, stabbed.
 February 27 – Manea Mănescu, 92, 50th Prime Minister of Romania (1974–1979) (born 1916)

March 

 March 19 - Ion Dolănescu, 65, Romanian singer and politician, heart attack.
 March 31 - Marga Barbu, 80, Romanian actress.

April 

 April 28 - Valeria Peter Predescu, 62, Romanian singer, heart attack.

May 

 May 9 - Mendi Rodan, 80, Romanian-born Israeli conductor and violinist, cancer.

July 

 July 6 - Mihai Baicu, 33, Romanian footballer, heart attack.

August 

 August 7 - Tatiana Stepa, 46, Romanian folk singer, cervical cancer.
 August 11 - Valeriu Lazarov, 73, Romanian-born Spanish television producer.
 August 15 - Florin Bogardo, 67, Romanian singer.

September 

 September 15 - Nicu Constantin, 70, Romanian actor.

October 

 October 3 - Vasile Louis Puscas, 94, American Bishop of St George's in Canton in the Romanian Catholic Church.
 October 13 - Paul Barbă Neagră, 80, Romanian film director and essayist.
 October 18
 Ion Cojar, 78, Romanian actor and film director, Parkinson's disease.
 Ovidiu Muşetescu, 54, Romanian politician, cancer.
 October 18 - Radu Timofte, 60, Romanian intelligence officer, director of the Serviciul Român de Informaţii (2001–2006), leukemia.
 October 25 - Thea Segall, 80, Romanian photographer who lived in Venezuela since 1958 until her death.

November 

 November 10 - Gheorghe Dinică, 75, Romanian actor, cardiac arrest.
 November 26 - Ecaterina Stahl-Iencic, 60, Romanian Olympic fencer.
 November 27 - Jacques Braunstein, 78, Romanian-born Venezuelan economist, publicist and jazz disc jockey, heart failure. (Spanish)

December 

 December28 - Zoltán Horváth, 30, Romanian-born Hungarian basketball player, car accident.

See also

List of Romanian films of 2009 
2009 in the European Union
Romania in the Eurovision Song Contest 2009

References

External links

 
Years of the 21st century in Romania
Romania
2000s in Romania
Romania